Bandar Indahpura (Jawi: بندر ايندهڤورا) or Asiatic Indahpura is a township in Kulai District, Johor, Malaysia. Indahpura is translated as "Beautiful City" in Malay.

The township is developed by Asiatic Development Berhad of Genting group. The Kulai District and Land Office will be built there. Indahpura is located 30 km (30 mins) north-west from Johor Bahru and south-west of Kulai city. The township is located 10 km (10 mins) from Senai International Airport and AirCargo Hub.

Indahpura is located in the Iskandar Malaysia corridor comprising the proposed Kulai District Police Headquarters,  of MSC Cyber City, Senai International Airport and AirCargo Hub, Senai Industrial Park, and Foon Yew High School (Kulai Campus).

Golf courses such as Palm Resort Golf & Country Club, Palm Villa Golf & Country Club, and Orchard Golf & Country Club are within 10 km radius from Indahpura.
 The National Railway line (KTM)
 Easy accessibility with 6 lanes main ingress and egress
 Education corridor

Facilities
 Hospital Temenggong Seri Maharaja Tun Ibrahim
 TM Point
 Kedai Tenaga Nasional Berhad
 Jabatan Pendaftaran Negara
 Kulai Besar Public Clinic

Education
Indahpura is being developed into a regional education corridor of Kulai and Iskandar Development Region. Schools in Indahpura are Foon Yew High School Kulai Campus, Sekolah Kebangsaan Indahpura, Sekolah Menengah Kebangsaan Indahpura, Sekolah Menengah Pendidikan Khas Vokasional Indahpura, and Sekolah Jenis Kebangsaan Cina Kulai 2.

Transportation
Second Link Expressway provides exits there to Johor Premium Outlets and residential area.

Shopping

 AEON Kulaijaya
 Johor Premium Outlets
 The Commune（Opening to 2023Q4）

Kulai District
Townships in Johor